Corvuso is an unincorporated community in Cedar Mills Township, Meeker County, Minnesota, United States.  The community is located along Meeker County Road 1 near State Highway 7 (MN 7).  The South Fork of the Crow River flows nearby.

Nearby places include Cosmos, Litchfield, and Hutchinson.

References

Unincorporated communities in Minnesota
Unincorporated communities in Meeker County, Minnesota